Jamaican E.T. is a reggae/dub album released by Lee "Scratch" Perry.  The album was released February 5, 2002 on the Sanctuary/Trojan label, and won the 2003 Grammy Award for 'Best Reggae Album'.

Track listing
All tracks by Lee "Scratch" Perry

 "10 Commandments" – 4:31
 "I'll Take You There" – 5:17
 "Message From The Black Ark Studios" – 4:19
 "Holyness, Righteousness, Light" – 4:22
 "Babylon Fall" – 5:45
 "Mr. Dino Koosh Rock" – 6:00
 "Hip Hop Reggae" – 4:59
 "Evil Brain Rejector" – 4:27
 "Jah Rastafari, Jungle Safari" – 4:49
 "Love Sunshine, Blue Sky" – 5:45
 "Clear The Way" – 4:30
 "Congratulations" – 4:22
 "Shocks Of Mighty" – 4:27
 "Jamaican E.T." – 5:44
 "Telepathic Jah A Rize" – 4:07

Personnel
Credits on "Jamaican E.T." include:

Lee "Scratch" Perry - vocals, producer
Al Fletcher - drums
Nick Welsh - bass
Chris Clunn - photography
Justin Dodsworth - keyboards
Leigh Malin - sax (tenor)
Tim Debney - mastering
Michelle Naylor - backing vocals
Sharron Naylor - backing vocals
Anthony Harty - guitar, electric percussion
Roger Lomas - engineer, mixing

References

2002 albums
Lee "Scratch" Perry albums
Albums produced by Lee "Scratch" Perry
Sanctuary Records albums
Grammy Award for Best Reggae Album